Guillermo Semler Aguirre (Santiago, January 16, 1959) better known as Willy Semler is a Chilean actor of films, theatre, television and theater director.

He is known for having played Esperanza in the popular play La negra Ester, one of the most classic plays of chilean history. In cinema, he has had roles in films such as Johnny cien pesos and El desquite, while on television he has been in successful telenovelas for over 40 years, in productions such as Amor a domicilio (1995), Adrenalina (1996), Playa salvaje (1997),  Fuera de control (1999), Los treinta (2005), and Pacto de sangre (2018) among many others. He worked as an announcer on Radio La Clave in the program "Enradiados" (2016–2017).

He studied in the Universidad de Chile.

Filmography

Films

Telenovelas

TV series

References

1959 births
Chilean male film actors
Chilean male telenovela actors
Chilean male television actors
Chilean theatre directors
Living people
People from Santiago
University of Chile alumni